Acústico MTV: Charlie Brown Jr. (Portuguese for "MTV Unplugged: Charlie Brown Jr.") is the first live album by Brazilian alternative rock band Charlie Brown Jr., released both in CD and DVD formats on September 20, 2003, through EMI as part of now-defunct MTV Brasil's Acústico MTV series – the Brazilian equivalent of MTV Unplugged. It was recorded at the Teatro Mars in São Paulo from August 5–6, 2003, in a lavish set decorated as the nave of a Gothic church.

The album contains acoustic-inflected re-interpretations of some of Charlie Brown Jr.'s greatest hits, alongside previously unreleased tracks such as "Vícios e Virtudes" and "Não Uso Sapato", and covers of bands and artists such as Nação Zumbi ("Samba Makossa"), Camisa de Vênus ("Hoje") and Jorge Ben Jor ("Oba, Lá Vem Ela"). Counting with guest appearances by Negra Li, Marcelo D2 of Planet Hemp fame, Camisa de Vênus frontman Marcelo Nova and hip hop group RZO, it was one of the band's most critically acclaimed and best-selling releases; the CD version was placed ninth in the list of most best-selling albums of 2003, and the DVD version in third. Overall, the CD version sold over 250,000 copies and won a Platinum certification by Pro-Música Brasil.

As extras, the DVD contains interviews with the bandmembers, a making-of and a track-by-track commentary.

Critical reception
Anderson Nascimento of Galeria Musical gave the album a maximum rating of 5 out of 5 stars, calling it one of the "coolest Acústico MTV releases ever". Mauro Ferreira of ISTOÉ also gave it a maximum rating, of 4 out of 4 stars; he considered it "the band's best release so far".

Track listing

Personnel
 Charlie Brown Jr.
 Chorão – vocals
 Champignon – acoustic bass guitar, beatboxing
 Marcão – classical guitar
 Renato Pelado – drums

 Guest musicians
 Tadeu Patolla – classical guitar
 Daniel Ganjaman – keyboards and Rhodes piano in "Samba Makossa"
 Fabrício Uruca – harmonica in "Samba Makossa"
 Negra Li – additional vocals in "Não É Sério"
 RZO – additional vocals in "A Banca"
 Marcelo Nova – additional vocals in "Hoje"
 Marcelo D2 – additional vocals in "Samba Makossa"

 Production
 Paulo Anhaia, Luiz Leme – mixing
 Romi Atarashi – direction

References

2003 video albums
Live video albums
2003 live albums
EMI Group live albums
EMI Group video albums
Charlie Brown Jr. albums
Portuguese-language live albums